Ivan Lloyd-Phillips CBE (June 1910 – 14 January 1984) was a British national who served in the Colonial Administrative Service. He was the son of Arthur Lloyd-Phillips, Vicar of Ware.

Appointments
First appointed to the Colonial Service in 1934, with appointments to: 
 Gold Coast (1934–1938);
 Palestine (1938–1947);
 District Commissioner of Gaza-Beersheba (1946–1947);
 Colonial Office (1947–1948);
 Cyprus (1948–1951);
 Commissioner, Nicosia-Kyrenia (1950–1951);
 Singapore (1951–1953);
 Commissioner-General's Office (1951–1952);
 Dep. Secretary for Defence (1952–1953);
 Malaya (1953–1962);
 Secretary to Chief Minister and Minister for Home Affairs (1955–1957);
 Secretary, Ministry of the Interior (1957–1962).

Later roles:
 Deputy Director, Oxford Colonial Records Project, Institute of Commonwealth Studies, University of Oxford, (1965–1970).

Honours
 Officer of the Order of the British Empire (OBE; 1959)
 Commander of the Order of the British Empire (CBE; 1963)

Education
 Selwyn College, Cambridge;
 Balliol College, Oxford (Doctor of Philosophy {DPhil}).

Quotes
 What a fantastic mess we are all in, and how different the world would have been if only Hitler had gone to Balliol! (written to his father from Jerusalem in October 1939)

1910 births
1984 deaths
Commanders of the Order of the British Empire
Llyod-Phillips, Ivan